Postal codes in Panama were introduced in 2007.  The postal code consists of four numeric digits.  The first two digits represent the province or provincial-level indigenous region. For the provinces, these are the same digits as used in its ISO 3166-2 code.

For a complete listing of the country's postal codes, broken down by province and district, visit the Panama Postal Codes page.

References

Panama
Communications in Panama